Kahi (also Romanized as Kāhī) is a village in Mud Rural District, Mud District, Sarbisheh County, South Khorasan Province, Iran. At the 2006 census, its population was 58, in 27 families.

References 

Populated places in Sarbisheh County